Roy Bakal is a former Israeli footballer, who played as a midfielder.

Honours
Liga Leumit: 2015-16

References

1987 births
Living people
Israeli footballers
Maccabi Petah Tikva F.C. players
Hapoel Nir Ramat HaSharon F.C. players
Alki Larnaca FC players
F.C. Ashdod players
Israeli expatriate footballers
Israeli Premier League players
Liga Leumit players
Cypriot First Division players
Footballers from Petah Tikva
Israeli people of Yemeni-Jewish descent
Expatriate footballers in Cyprus
Israeli expatriate sportspeople in Cyprus
Association football midfielders